Referring Peak is a conspicuous black peak over 1,200 m, standing on the north side of Mackay Glacier about 1.5 nautical miles (2.8 km) west of the mouth of Cleveland Glacier, in Victoria land. Charted and named by the British Antarctic Expedition, 1910–13. The name suggests the easy identification of the peak and its use as a landmark.

Mountains of Victoria Land
Scott Coast